This is a list of National Historic Sites in the province of Saskatchewan.  As of July 2021, there were 49 National Historic Sites designated in Saskatchewan, 10 of which are administered by Parks Canada (identified below by the beaver icon ).

Numerous National Historic Events also occurred in Saskatchewan, and are identified at places associated with them, using the same style of federal plaque which marks National Historic Sites. Several National Historic Persons are commemorated throughout the province in the same way. The markers do not indicate which designation—a Site, Event, or Person—a subject has been given. The Rideau Canal is a Site, for example, while the Welland Canal is an Event. The cairn and plaque to John Macdonell does not refer to a National Historic Person, but is erected because his home, Glengarry House, is a National Historic Site. Similarly, the plaque to John Guy officially marks not a Person, but an Event—the Landing of John Guy.

This list uses names designated by the national Historic Sites and Monuments Board, which may differ from other names for these sites.

National Historic Sites

See also

History of Saskatchewan
List of historic places in Saskatchewan
Heritage Property Act (Saskatchewan)

References

 
Saskatchewan